The 2013 Cincinnati Bengals season was the franchise's 44th season in the National Football League, the 46th overall, and the 11th under head coach Marvin Lewis. The Bengals improved on their 10–6 regular season record from 2012 and clinched the AFC North division title. However, the Bengals lost 27–10 to the San Diego Chargers in the playoffs – the third consecutive season that the Bengals had lost in the Wild Card round. Their training camp was featured on the HBO show Hard Knocks.

2013 draft class

Notes
 The Bengals acquired this second-round selection as part of a  trade that sent quarterback Carson Palmer to the Oakland Raiders.
 The Bengals acquired this sixth-round selection as part of a 2011 trade that sent wide receiver Chad Johnson to the New England Patriots.
 The Bengals traded their original seventh-round selection (No. 227 overall) to the San Francisco 49ers in exchange for safety Taylor Mays.
 Compensatory selection.

Staff

Final roster

Schedule

Preseason

Regular season

Note: Intra-division opponents are in bold text.

Postseason

Game summaries

Regular season

Week 1: at Chicago Bears

The Bengals would build a 21-10 lead, but it would vanish as the Bears would rally to win.

With the loss, the Bengals started 0-1 for the second straight season.

Week 2: vs. Pittsburgh Steelers

With their second straight victory over the Steelers, the Bengals went to 1-1, and beat the Steelers at home for the first time since 2009.

Week 3: vs. Green Bay Packers

The Bengals defeated the Green Bay Packers 34–30, and also became the first team in NFL history to lead by 14 points, then trail by 16 and eventually win.

Week 4: at Cleveland Browns

With the loss, the Bengals fell to 2–2.

Week 5: vs. New England Patriots

The Bengals improved to 3-2. They also defeated Tom Brady for the first time ever.

Week 6: at Buffalo Bills

 Mike Nugent would kick the game-winning field goal in overtime to seal the game for the Bengals. With the win, the Bengals went to 4-2 and picked up their first win in Buffalo since 1985, snapping their 6-game road losing streak against the Bills.

Week 7: at Detroit Lions

Mike Nugent would come through with the clutch as the Bengals won 27-24 for the second week in a row. With their 5th straight win in Detroit, the Bengals went to 5-2.

Week 8: vs. New York Jets

With the easy win, the Bengals improved to 6-2. This win also remains the largest in the Marvin Lewis era, as of 2016. The 49 points were also the most scored by the Bengals since 2009 against the Bears.

Week 9: at Miami Dolphins

Andy Dalton would have a rough night, as he was intercepted 3 times. The game would end with him getting sacked in the end zone by Cameron Wake. This was also the first overtime game to end on a safety since 2004.

Week 10: at Baltimore Ravens

Despite out gaining Baltimore in total yardage, 364-189, and a hail mary at the end of regulation to force overtime, Andy Dalton threw 3 interceptions in the loss. With the loss, the Bengals fell to 6-4.

Week 11: vs. Cleveland Browns

The Bengals set a franchise record for most points scored in 1 quarter with 31 in this game.

With the win, the Bengals improved to 7-4.

Week 13: at San Diego Chargers

The Chargers opened the game by driving 45 yards to the Bengals 31, but on 3rd-and-10, Philip Rivers completed a 13-yard pass to Antonio Gates who was stripped by Reggie Nelson with George Iloka recovering for Cincinnati. After both teams swapped punts, the Bengals marched 67 yards in 10 plays with BenJarvus Green-Ellis rushing for a 4-yard touchdown on the first play of the 2nd quarter. The Bengals responded on their very next drive, driving 78 yards in only 8 plays with Rivers bombing a 30-yard touchdown pass to Ladarius Green. After both teams swapped punts again, Andy Dalton was intercepted by Eric Weddle who returned it 21 yards to the Chargers 45. The game was a 7-7 deadlock at halftime. However, on the Chargers opening drive of the second half Rivers was intercepted by Dre Kirkpatrick at the Bengals 25. The Bengals responded by driving 59 yards on a 10-play drive with Dalton connecting with superstar receiver A. J. Green on a 21-yard touchdown pass for a 14-7 lead. The Chargers drove to the Bengals 31, but were forced to punt. But the Bengals drove 61 yards before Mike Nugent booted a 47-yard field goal, extending the lead to 17-7. On their next drive, Rivers hit Keenan Allen for 14 yards, but Iloka forced Allen to fumble and Vincent Rey recovered for the Bengals. The Bengals took over at the Chargers 34. Two plays later Dalton threw a short pass to for 5 yards, but was stripped by Marcus Gilchrist with Weddle recovering and returning the ball 27 yards to the Bengals 43. The Chargers reached the Bengals 30 and Nick Novak made it a 7-point game at 17-10 with his 48-yard field goal. The Bengals ended the game with a Green-Ellis 5-yard run to the Chargers 3-yard line with less than two minutes remaining. With the win the Bengals improved to 8-4.

Week 14: vs. Indianapolis Colts

With the win, the Bengals improved to 9-4.

Week 15: at Pittsburgh Steelers

With the loss, the Bengals fell to 9–5 and enabled their division rival Ravens to be in the running for the AFC North title.

Week 16: vs. Minnesota Vikings

With the win, the Bengals improved to 10–5, and with the Ravens' loss to the Patriots later in the evening, they clinched the AFC North title.

Week 17: vs. Baltimore Ravens

With the win, the Bengals surpassed their win total from 2012.

Postseason

AFC Wild Card Playoffs: vs. (6) San Diego Chargers

The Bengals lost the AFC Wild Card playoff game against the Chargers, 27–10, thus eliminating them.  This loss also gives the team their 6th straight playoff loss dating back to the 1990 playoffs.

Standings

Division

Conference

Statistics

Team
Updated December 31, 2013

Individual

Passing
Updated December 31, 2013

Rushing
Updated January 3, 2014

Receiving
Updated January 3, 2014

Field Goals
Updated January 10, 2014

Punting
Updated January 10, 2014

Punt Returns
Updated January 14, 2014

Kick Returns
Updated January 14, 2014

Defense
Updated December 7, 2013

References

External links
 

Cincinnati
Cincinnati Bengals seasons
AFC North championship seasons
Cincin